The Belgian National Division 1, commonly referred to as simply Eerste Nationale (in Dutch) or Nationale 1 (in French) is a semi-professional and the third-highest division in the Belgian football league system, one level below the Belgian First Division B. It was created by the Royal Belgian Football Association in 2016, coming in at the third level and pushing all divisions one level down. Until the 2019–20 season, it was known as the Belgian First Amateur Division, but was renamed due to the negative connotation of the word amateur.

History
The Belgian First Amateur Division was created in 2016 following an overhaul of the Belgian football league system which saw the number of professional clubs reduced to 24. As a result, from the third level and below only amateur clubs remain. The two remaining levels above the Belgian Provincial leagues were reformed into three amateur levels, namely the Belgian First Amateur Division, the Belgian Second Amateur Division and the Belgian Third Amateur Division. As a result, the Belgian Provincial Leagues dropped to the sixth level of the league system. In 2020 the levels were renamed to Belgian National Division 1, Belgian Division 2, and Belgian Division 3 respectively.

Competition format
The season is a regular round-robin tournament with 16 teams. The top four teams after the regular season play a promotion playoff in which they keep 50% of the obtained points during the regular season and the team with the most points after the playoff is promoted to the Belgian First Division B.

Regarding relegation, the bottom three teams are automatically demoted, while the team finishing in 13th place play a relegation playoff together with three teams from the Belgian Second Amateur Division with the playoff winner obtaining a spot in the following season's Belgian First Amateur Division.

Past results overview

Footnotes

References

 
Sports leagues established in 2016
2016 establishments in Belgium
Third level football leagues in Europe
3